Tony Fisher (born October 12, 1979) is a former American football running back who was signed to the Green Bay Packers as a free agent. He also played for the St. Louis Rams. He was signed by the New York Jets on July 27, 2007 but was released just two weeks later.

In 1997, Fisher won the prestigious Mr. Football Award as the player deemed to be the best high school football player in the state of Ohio.

References

1979 births
Living people
People from Euclid, Ohio
Players of American football from Ohio
American football running backs
Notre Dame Fighting Irish football players
Green Bay Packers players
St. Louis Rams players
Sportspeople from Cuyahoga County, Ohio